Aijaz Dhebar is an Indian politician from Chhattisgarh representing the Indian National Congress. In 2020, he was elected as the mayor of Raipur.

References

External links
 Official Notifiation

1976 births
Living people
20th-century Indian politicians
Indian National Congress politicians from Chhattisgarh